10551 Göteborg, provisional designation , is a stony Eoan asteroid and slow rotator from the outer region of the asteroid belt, approximately 13 kilometers in diameter. It was discovered on 18 December 1992, by Belgian astronomer Eric Elst at CERGA in Caussols, southeastern France. The asteroid was named after the Swedish city of Gothenburg (Göteborg).

Orbit and classification 

Göteborg is a member of the Eos family, an orbital group of more than 4,000 asteroids, which are well known for mostly being of stony composition with a relatively high albedo. It orbits the Sun in the outer main-belt at a distance of 2.8–3.2 AU once every 5 years and 2 months (1,892 days). Its orbit has an eccentricity of 0.06 and an inclination of 11° with respect to the ecliptic.

Physical characteristics

Slow rotator 

In September 2012, photometric observations of Göteborg at the Palomar Transient Factory, California, rendered a rotational lightcurve with a period of  hours, or 14 days, and a brightness variation of 0.70 magnitude. This makes a slow rotator, as most asteroids of this size typically have much shorter rotation periods.

Diameter and albedo 

According to the survey carried out by the NEOWISE mission of NASA's Wide-field Infrared Survey Explorer, Göteborg measures 15.491 and 15.689 kilometers in diameter and its surface has an albedo of 0.084 and 0.1169, respectively The Collaborative Asteroid Lightcurve Link assumes an albedo of 0.14, taken from 221 Eos, the family's largest member and namesake – and calculates a diameter of 11.53 kilometers based on an absolute magnitude of 12.44.

Naming 

This minor planet was named after Gothenburg (Göteborg), Sweden's second-largest city and the largest port in the Nordic countries, located on the country's southwest coast. Founded in the early 17th century and heavily influenced by the Dutch, the city still has its typical canal system. Later, the Swedes acquired political power over Gothenburg and the city flourished with the development of the Swedish East India Company in the early 18th century. The approved naming citation was published by the Minor Planet Center on 20 March 2000.

References

External links 
 Asteroid Lightcurve Database (LCDB), query form (info )
 Dictionary of Minor Planet Names, Google books
 Asteroids and comets rotation curves, CdR – Observatoire de Genève, Raoul Behrend
 Discovery Circumstances: Numbered Minor Planets (10001)-(15000) – Minor Planet Center
 
 

010551
Discoveries by Eric Walter Elst
Named minor planets
010551
19921218